Pontixanthobacter gangjinensis  is a Gram-negative, aerobic, halotolerant and non-motile bacterium from the genus Pontixanthobacter which has been isolated from tidal flat from Gangjin bay on Korea.

References

External links
Type strain of Altererythrobacter gangjinensis at BacDive -  the Bacterial Diversity Metadatabase

Sphingomonadales
Bacteria described in 2013
Halophiles